Naten is a lake in Södermanland, Sweden.

References

Lakes of Södermanland County